Nokesville is a census-designated place (CDP) in Prince William County, Virginia, United States and Fauquier County, Virginia, United States. The population was 1,354 at the 2010 census.

History
Nokesville was the center of a farming community with cattle and dairy farms; it became a town and intermediate stop on the Orange & Alexandria Railway in 1865. In the late 19th century–early 20th century, Nokesville was the location of a religious movement called the German Baptist Brethren, which became known as the Church of the Brethren. In the 1950s, it was cut off from passenger trains and was a rural community today.

Nokesville is served by four schools in Prince William County. The oldest school, Nokesville Elementary was built in 1929 to serve all grades until 1964 when it was lowered to K-5 with the construction of Brentsville District High School.  In 2014, Nokesville Elementary moved to a new building that was built next to Brentsville District High School on Aden Road.  This new school is called The Nokesville School and serves a K-8 community. The old school was sold and is now a Montessori school. Patriot High School is located on Kettle Run Road, and was opened in 2011. Built concurrently, next door is T. Clay Wood Elementary School. The Nokesville postal delivery area consists of two schools in Fauquier. Kettle Run High School and Greenville Elementary are both new schools built on the Fauquier County side of Nokesville.

Marstellar Middle School is located nearby in Bristow, and middle school students formerly attended this middle school prior to the K–8 school opening.

The Lawn, Nokesville Truss Bridge, Brentsville Historic District, Park Gate, and Pilgrim's Rest are listed on the National Register of Historic Places.

Civil War

Greenwich

Trails sign at Greenwich Presbyterian Church, 
15305 Vint Hill Road, Nokesville ROAD MAP 
 
Union and Confederate forces passed by or camped here frequently during the war. Federal units pursuing Stonewall Jackson to Manassas Junction camped here in August 1862; fighting involving John S. Mosby's rangers flared near here and Confederates marched past on the way to nearby Bristoe Station in October 1863.

Battle of Kettle Run

Nokesville Road (Route 28) and Aden Road, Nokesville VA 20181 ROAD MAP

As Stonewall Jackson's troops occupied and looted the railroad junction at Manassas August 27, 1862, Federal forces approached his rear guard at Kettle Run. The Confederates there managed to delay the Union force before withdrawing -Source

Geography
Nokesville is located at  (38.698350, −77.573656).

According to the United States Census Bureau, the CDP has a total area of 9.5 square miles (24.5 km2), all of it land.

The Nokesville  postal delivery area borders Bristow to the north, Catlett to the west, Independent Hill to the south and Canova to the east. Most of the area consists of subdivisions and former farms with the "Village" straddling Fitzwater Drive between Aden Road and Nokesville Road (SR 28), which consists of a U.S. Post Office, Nokesville Family Dentistry, Carini's Pizza ( a hometown favorite), Herf Jones Rings, Nokesville Print & Copy, Nokesville Library, Nokesville Tires, Nokesville Veterinary, and many other small businesses. On the same street is the former Nokesville Elementary and several churches.

Demographics
As of the census of 2010, there were 1,354 people, 488 households. The racial makeup of the CDP was 90.8% White, 3.2% African American, 0.4% Native American, 1.9% Asian, 0% Pacific Islander, and 2.2% from two or more races. Hispanic or Latino of any race were 5.2% of the population.

There were 488 households, out of which 30.7% had children under the age of 18 living with them, 64.5% were married couples living together, 9.2% had a female householder with no husband present, and 21.7% were non-families. The average household size was 2.77 and the average family size was 3.08.

The median age was 42.9 years. 50.4% of the population is male with 49.6% female.

The median income for a household as seen in the 2000 census was $63,793, and the median income for a family was $68,611. Males had a median income of $41,875 versus $27,188 for females. The per capita income for the CDP was $24,765. None of the families and 0.8% of the population were living below the poverty line, including no under eighteens and 5.2% of those over 64.

Sport
The Northern Virginia Eagles of the USA Rugby League are based in Nokesville.

Events

The Nokesville Ruritans host several notable events, such as the Brunswick Stew and Nokesville Day. 
The Brunswick Stew is usually held in the fall at Nokesville Elementary. It is an opportunity for members of the community to gather and purchase quarts of Brunswick Stew. There is typically music and a bonfire. Nokesville Day is a parade held the third Saturday in May that gives everyone in town a chance to gather on Fitzwater Dr. The fire department, local politicians, marching band, and Equestrian Society are only a few of the many regular participants. It also hosts hundreds of various vendors.

The Victory Baptist Church off Aden Rd. annually hosts a Fall Festival in October. Games, moon bounces, hayrides, and live music are often involved. Members outside of the church are encouraged to attend. The Nokesville Elementary also hosts a Fall Festival on an evening in October that offers kid friendly games and cake walks.

Asbury United Methodist Church (UMC) on Fleetwood Drive hosts an annual Chicken Barbecue each fall coinciding with the annual Prince William Farm Tour. Tours of the historic Asbury Church (built in 1892) are offered. On the first Saturday in March, Asbury UMC hosts an annual Pancake and Sausage Supper.

Football games at Brentsville District High School, particularly the Homecoming game each year are well-attended. In the week before the game, cheerleaders put the names and numbers of every football player on ball-shaped laminated signs. The signs line Fitzwater Dr. to advertise the upcoming games and encourage attendance.

References

External links

 Official Website of Prince William County
 Prince William Conservation Alliance
 Nokesville Business Association
 Nokesville Civic Association
 Nokesville Volunteer Fire and Rescue Department
 Asbury United Methodist Church

Census-designated places in Virginia
Census-designated places in Prince William County, Virginia
Washington metropolitan area
Populated places established in 1865
1865 establishments in Virginia